In Mexico is the second photo book by American visual artist Jessica Lange, published by RM in United States, Mexico, Spain and United Kingdom, respectively, in 2010. As such, her monograph that followed a pattern of its predecessor 50 Photographs (2008), was issued on the Spanish-speaking market under an alternate title, En México.

In addition to, the release of the Lange's art work spawned a two-segment promotional worldwide tour. Since its opening in 2011, the exhibition reached an international audience across North America and Europe.

Background 
Additional credits
 Co-produced by: ROSEGALLERY, Santa Monica, CA/Howard Greenberg Gallery, New York City, NY
 Design: David Kimura and Gabriela Varela

Release history

Art exhibitions

2011—2015: Americas and Eurasia

Reception

Awards

See also
 Jessica Lange awards 
 Jessica Lange bibliography
 Jessica Lange discography
 Jessica Lange filmography

Footnotes

References

Sources

External links

Jessica Lange - In Mexico/En México (official website on RM)

Books by Jessica Lange
2010 non-fiction books
Books of photographs
Photographic collections and books